Lifestyle Asia is a digital news platform owned by BurdaLuxury, a subsidiary of German media conglomerate Hubert Burda Media. It was launched in Hong Kong by Swedish entrepreneurs Richard Nilsson, Christopher Lindvall and Sebastian Svensson in 2006. 

Centred on luxury lifestyle, the website covers topics such as fashion, dining, travel, living, beauty, culture, and motoring. It has editorial teams in Bangkok, Hong Kong, India, Kuala Lumpur and Singapore.

History 
Richard Nilsson, Christopher Lindvall, and Sebastian Svensson founded Lifestyle Asia in Hong Kong in July 2006. Targeted at English-speaking readers, the website was presented as a luxury city guide focusing on fashion, travel, dining, and nightlife. 

As the brand expanded over the years, dedicated teams were set up in Singapore (2008), Bangkok (2009), Kuala Lumpur (2012), and India (2018), with local editions established for each of those territories. The latter has two offices based in New Delhi and Mumbai.

Lifestyle Asia was acquired in January 2017 by BurdaLuxury, formerly known as Burda International Asia, a subsidiary of Hubert Burda Media.

Content 
Lifestyle Asia focuses on luxury lifestyle in Asia and around the world, spanning fashion, dining, travel, culture, watches, jewellery, wellness, beauty, grooming, living, motoring, and technology. Its content is geared towards affluent readers aged 25 to 45, and is produced by in-house editorial teams.

The website's content comprises mostly original editorial pieces, though native content is also published. Stories range from lifestyle news and long form articles to dining reviews, personality interviews, and fashion lookbooks. Redesigned several times over the years, the current interface features a multi-story homepage slider, visually-driven category dropdown menus, and multiple recirculation points, including a Most Popular sidebar updated in real-time according to content analytics. New features include the Directory, a guide to trendy local dining and shopping spots, and City Guides, a curated category-focused compilation of Directory listings for easy navigation.

In July 2020, Lifestyle Asia launched LSA Curates, a site-wide travel partnership offering unique lifestyle experiences exclusive to its readers.

Accolades 
Lifestyle Asia has won multiple awards including a Silver award at 2017 TECH Design Awards, and Digital Media Product of the Year at Magazine Publishers Association of Singapore (MPAS) in 2011 and 2012. It also topped the Lifestyle category on Marketing Interactive’s Digital Media of the Year list in 2016, and placed second in 2014 and 2017.

References

External links

Hong Kong news websites
Mass media companies established in 2006
2006 establishments in Hong Kong